Hollywood Masonic Temple, now known as the El Capitan Entertainment Centre and also formerly known as Masonic Convention Hall, is a building on Hollywood Boulevard in the Hollywood neighborhood of Los Angeles, California, U.S., that was listed on the National Register of Historic Places in 1985. The building, built in 1921, was designed by architect John C. Austin, also noted as the lead architect of the Griffith Observatory. The Masons operated the temple until 1982, when they sold the building after several years of declining membership. The 34,000-square-foot building was then converted into a theater and nightclub, and ownership subsequently changed several times, until it was bought by the Walt Disney Company's Buena Vista Pictures Distribution in 1998 for Buena Vista Theatres, Inc.

Buena Vista Theatres uses it as a promotion tool by creating themed environments to go along with movie premieres. The center is also rented out for industry parties, premieres, record releases and product roll-outs. Since 2003, the building's theater has been the home of ABC's late-night talk show Jimmy Kimmel Live!.

The building is rumored to have had a secret tunnel to Grauman's Chinese Theatre that would allow movie stars to evade mobs at movie premieres. If it existed it is possible that the B Line (Red) subway construction destroyed the tunnel.

History

The Masonic Temple

In 1922, the Hollywood Lodge of the Masons relocated from their existing lodge on the current site of the Dolby Theatre. The construction of the new three-story building was led by lodge master Charles E. Toberman, who was responsible for the Hollywood Bowl, Grauman's Chinese Theatre,  the Roosevelt Hotel and the Max Factor Building. The original building cost $176,678, with a sum of $56,421 allotted to furniture and fixtures and $36,295 for the purchase of the lot. Toberman and fellow member Charles Boag formed a Hollywood Masonic Club to partly finance the building offering membership subscriptions for $100.

When the new temple opened, it was one of the most substantial structures in Hollywood. It had a billiard room, pipe organ, ladies parlor, ballroom, and lodge rooms. One writer described the building as "unsurpassed for beauty, attractiveness and richness of equipment." The architect, John C. Austin, also worked on the Shrine Auditorium, Griffith Observatory, and Los Angeles City Hall.

The Los Angeles Times described the building this way in 2002:

It's an impassive presence that seems to transcend the ebb and flow of Tinseltown glamour — a somber Neoclassical temple that stands in stark contrast to the evolving parade of movers, shakers, panhandlers and paparazzi that have passed before it.

The grand ballroom was opened in February 1923; the opening ball featured a program on "the evolution of dance" featuring dancer Lucille Means. Many of Hollywood's elite over the years have been Masons, including Oliver Hardy, Harold Lloyd, Douglas Fairbanks, W.C. Fields, Cecil B. DeMille, D.W. Griffith, John Wayne, Roy Rogers, and Gene Autry.

During the Great Depression, many of the Masons lost their savings, and the Masons were forced to rent the ground floor to a social club that installed an illegal slot machine. After World War II, the Masons resumed full use of the structure, and in 1948, more than 300 people crowded into the Masonic Temple to attend a memorial service for D. W. Griffith. In 1969, longtime Mason Harold Lloyd was honored in a ceremony as his name was placed on the Hollywood Walk of Fame, directly in front of the Masonic Temple.

Opera theater and nightclub
By the late 1970s, Masonic membership had declined, and the Masons rented out ground-floor space to a restaurant. In 1980, the lodge moved out of the building to Van Nuys and renamed the Hollywood-West Valley Lodge. By 1982, the Masons could not afford upgrades to meet revised fire and seismic codes.  The Masons sold the building to singer Rosita LaBello who converted the structure into the Hollywood Opera & Theater Company. The building's life with LaBello's opera and theater company was short-lived with only a few operatic productions. With the opera and theater company's failure, the building was sold back to the lodge.

In , Detroit developer James Hoseyni signed a 20-year lease with an $2.7 million 3-year option to buy with building owner 6840 Hollywood Associates, an affiliate of Westmark Development. Westmark Development at that time had Nicholas Olaerts and Thomas Harnsberger as general partners and who were owners of El Capitan Theatre by 1992. Donald Bruce Randall, an architect of the Randall/Baylon Partnership of Los Angeles, and Tehran-born Kamal Kamooneh, the project's creative architect, with Hoseyni lead the renovation costing $1.5 million to house a 250-seat cabaret, 500-seat jazz theater and an 800-person dance club. The Blue and Red Halls were restored then modified for a disc jockey's podium, special electronic and lighting equipment and bars. The bathrooms were moved to the basement to create more floor space. In September 1987, the building was renovated and reopened as the Hollywood Live Entertainment Pavilions with a cover charge for all venues. Hollywood Live lasted only a short time.

For the 1995 Toy Story premiere at the next door El Capitan Theater, Disney rented the building for Totally Toy Story, a multimedia funhouse promotional event for the movie. In mid-July 1998, Buena Vista Pictures Distribution purchased the building from a bankrupt individual for $3.6 million to continue using it as a promotional venue.

El Capitan Entertainment Centre
In 2002, after extensive renovation, Disney reopened the building as the El Capitan Entertainment Centre. Disney restored original fixtures, including backlighted stone filigree, wrought iron torchieres, Batchelder tiles and old post boxes once used by Masonic officers.

On , ABC—which is owned by Disney—premiered the late-night talk show Jimmy Kimmel Live!; the series has been broadcast from the Masonic Temple's theatre since its premiere.

See also

 Los Angeles Historic-Cultural Monuments in Hollywood
List of Registered Historic Places in Los Angeles

References

Former Masonic buildings in California
Masonic buildings completed in 1921
Clubhouses on the National Register of Historic Places in Los Angeles
Los Angeles Historic-Cultural Monuments
Neoclassical architecture in California
Buildings and structures in Hollywood, Los Angeles
Hollywood Boulevard
Walt Disney Studios (division)